The 1889–90 Midland Football League season was the first in the history of the Midland Football League, a football competition in England.

References

External links

M
Midland Football League (1889)